Quaker Bridge may refer to:
Quaker Bridge, a bridge in Hempfield Township, Mercer County, Pennsylvania
Quaker Bridge, Mercer County, New Jersey, an unincorporated community
Quaker Bridge, New York, a ghost town